St. Martin's croissant is a croissant with white poppy-seed filling traditionally prepared in Poznań and some parts of Greater Poland region on the occasion of St. Martin's Day (11 November).

By EC regulation No 1070/2008 of 30 October 2008, the name rogal świętomarciński was entered in the register of protected designations of origin and protected geographical indications in the European Union.

History
This tradition dates back to pagan times, when during the autumn feast the gods were offered sacrifices of oxen or, as a substitute, of dough rolled up in oxen horns. The Latin Church has taken over this custom and linked it to the figure of St Martin. The shape of the dough was interpreted as a reference to the horseshoe that the holy horse was to lose.

In Poznań, the tradition of baking 'rogal świętomarciński' on 11 November certainly existed in 1860, when the oldest known advertisement for the 'rogal świętomarciński' was published in Dziennik Poznański.

However, there is a popular legend that the tradition in its present form was born in November 1891. As St. Martin's Day was approaching, the parish priest of St. Martin's parish, Fr Jan Lewicki, appealed to the faithful to do something for the poor, following the example of the patron saint. The confectioner Józef Melzer, who was present at the mass and worked in a nearby confectionery, persuaded his boss to revive the old tradition. The wealthier Poznań residents bought a delicacy and the poor received it for free. The custom of baking in 1901 was taken over by the Association of Confectioners. After the First World War, Franciszek Rączyński returned to the tradition of giving gifts to the poor, and after the Second World War, Zygmunt Wasiński saved the croissant from oblivion.

Ingredients
The filling must consist of white poppy seeds, vanilla, crushed dates or figs, raisins and cream. Rogal świętomarciński is coated with a sugar icing and sprinkled with peanuts.

See also

 Poznań Croissant Museum
 Kifli
 List of pastries
Święty Marcin

External links

References

Polish pastries
Polish desserts
Poznań
Polish products with protected designation of origin